Burgandine House is a historic home located at Culpeper, Culpeper County, Virginia. It was built about 1800, and is a -story, plank log dwelling. It has a gable roof and weatherboard siding. The building served periodically for several years as the headquarters for the Culpeper Historical Society.  It is considered the oldest residence in Culpeper.

It was listed on the National Register of Historic Places in 1997.

References

Houses on the National Register of Historic Places in Virginia
Houses completed in 1800
Houses in Culpeper County, Virginia
National Register of Historic Places in Culpeper County, Virginia